Aleksandr Aleksandrovich Oleinik (born 1 January 1982) is a former Russian professional footballer.

Club career
He made his debut in the Russian Premier League in 2001 for FC Chernomorets Novorossiysk. He played 2 games in the UEFA Cup 2001–02 for FC Chernomorets Novorossiysk.

External links
 Profile at fckrasnodar.ru (in Russian)

1982 births
Living people
Russian footballers
FC Kuban Krasnodar players
FC Chernomorets Novorossiysk players
Russian Premier League players
FC Volgar Astrakhan players
FC Krasnodar players
Association football midfielders
FC Orenburg players
FC Nosta Novotroitsk players